Eumenodora encrypta is a moth in the family Xyloryctidae. It was described by Edward Meyrick in 1906. It is found in India.

The wingspan is about 7 mm. The forewings are ochreous brownish with four narrow obscure suffused whitish longitudinal streaks (subcostal, discal, plical, and dorsal) from the base to about three-fourths, irrorated (sprinkled) with grey more strongly posteriorly. Beyond these is a similar acutely angulated transverse line at five-sixths marked with an extremely fine dash or group of blackish-grey scales in the disc, and streaks on the apical part of the costa and termen. There are some blackish-grey scales on the fold towards the tornus. The hindwings are grey whitish in males, with a thin expansible pencil of very fine whitish hairs from the base of the costa. The female hindwings are light grey.

The larvae feed on the needles of Casuarina species.

References

Xyloryctidae
Moths described in 1924